GreenPalm is a certificate-trading program for "sustainably produced" palm oil. Established in Hull, England, in November 2006, GreenPalm is a trading name of Book & Claim Ltd., "a wholly owned subsidiary of" AarhusKarlshamn UK Ltd.

Operation 

Once an oil palm grower has gone through the RSPO certification process and has been certified, they have four supply chain options to sell through. These options are:

 Identity Preserved
 Segregated
 Mass Balance
 Book and Claim (GreenPalm)

If the palm oil growers chose GreenPalm, then each tonne of certified palm oil & palm kernel oil they are certified to sell is transferred into a GreenPalm Palm & Palm Kernel Oil certificate. The certificates are offered for sale on the GreenPalm market. Manufacturers based around the globe that use palm oil, palm kernel oil or any derived product can then join GreenPalm. Once they are a member they can place bids for, buy and then redeem certificates equal to the amount of physical oil they wish to cover. All those manufacturers that have redeemed certificates can see their commitment on the GreenPalm redeemed certificate holder’s page. Once redeemed, the manufacturer can use the GreenPalm logo and make claims that they or their products support/advance the production of RSPO certified sustainable palm, palm kernel oil.

The palm oil grower receives the full certificate premium, the physical RSPO certified oil that this relates to will be sold into the global market – someone, somewhere will consume sustainably produced palm / palm kernel oil. This process stimulates other palm oil growers to start the certification process for their plantation and mill.

Support 

Dave McLaughlin, agriculture vice-president, World Wildlife Fund, is reported as stating that "GreenPalm is a transitional tool to give growers the right market signals" that it is worth their while to participate in the RSPO's sustainable palm oil auditing and certification programs.

In an interview subtitled, "The rocky road to sustainable palm oil," Dave Mclaughlin, World Wildlife Fund vice-president for agriculture, states that "buying GreenPalm certificates now might be the only way to stimulate enough production of sustainable palm oil to reach a critical mass that will make fully traceable products economically viable in future."

References

External links 
 

Palm oil companies
Environmental certification
Companies based in Kingston upon Hull
Renewable resource companies established in 2006
2006 establishments in England
British companies established in 2006
Agriculture companies established in 2006